Nicolae Olaru (born 16 December 1958) is a Moldovan politician and entrepreneur, member of the LDPM, member of the Parliament of the Republic of Moldova. On 2 July 2014, along with the LDPM fraction, he voted for the ratification of the Association Agreement between the European Union and the Republic of Moldova.

Biography 

He has been a member of the Parliament of Moldova since 2010.

External links  
 Curtea Constitutionala a validat mandatele a opt noi deputati 
 Site-ul Parlamentului Republicii Moldova

References 

1958 births
Living people
Liberal Democratic Party of Moldova MPs
Moldovan MPs 2009–2010